The Armstrong Whitworth Awana was a British prototype troop-transport aircraft built to meet a 1920 Air Ministry requirement.

Design and development
The Awana was designed in response to Air Ministry Specification 5/20 for a twin-engined Troop Carrying Aeroplane, able to carry 25 fully equipped troops for a distance of 400 miles. Any design was to be capable of landing on rough terrain, other requirements being folding wings and the ability to fly on one engine.

One of the largest landplanes of its time, it was a large, twin-engine four-bay staggered biplane with a box-like fuselage, and a three-rudder, biplane tail. The pilot and navigator sat in open cockpits atop the nose, while the 25 troops it was to carry entered through a hatch in the floor and sat in two rows of "bus"-style seats with a centre aisle. It was of composite construction, with a tubular-steel-framed fuselage and wooden wings incorporating substantial hinges to allow them to be folded for storage. The Napier Lion engines were supported on tubular-steel supports between the wings and housed in streamlined cowlings with retractable radiators on the underside. The three cylindrical main petrol tanks were slung under the floor in an aluminium fairing, and fed fuel via windmill-driven pumps to header tanks on the underside of the upper wing.

Two prototypes were ordered by the Air Ministry on 27 June 1921, and the first prototype, serial number J6897, first flew on 28 June 1923. Evaluated at Martlesham Heath, control during landing was found to be poor, and the structure overall too flimsy. The second prototype addressed some of these concerns, but the Vickers Victoria was selected for production instead.

Specifications

See also

References

Notes

Bibliography

 

  
 
 

Awana
1920s British military transport aircraft
Cancelled military aircraft projects of the United Kingdom
Biplanes
Aircraft first flown in 1923
Twin piston-engined tractor aircraft